is a Japanese variety entertainer.

Biography
Sakaguchi was born on March 3, 1991, in Tokyo. She graduated from Shōtō Kindergarten, Seijo Gakuen Primary School, Seijo Gakuen Junior High School and High School, and Horikoshi High School.

Sakaguchi's mother is actress Ryoko Sakaguchi, her father was formerly a real estate company executive, her stepfather is the professional golfer Tateo Ozaki. She has a brother that is two years older than her. Her parents divorced on 1994, and she grew up with her mother.

Sakaguchi was a fan of Morning Musume and joined the entertainment industry in 2008. Her first leading film role was in Honey Flappers in 2014.

At the end of March 2016, Sakaguchi left Avilla at her own request.

She became an adult video actress, releasing her first video in October 2016. Sakaguchi began stripping in June 2018, and began working as a hostess.

On June 8, 2022, she announced her marriage. But on August 15, she announced her divorce through Instagram, after lasting only two months.

Filmography

Adult Video

TV series

Dramas

Radio series

Films

References

External links
 – MUTEKI official website specializing in entertainers 
 – Wayback Machine 
 – Ameba Blog (June 27, 2008 – December 21, 2015) 
 – GREE (January 19, 2010 – May 12, 2011) 

Japanese gravure models
Japanese television personalities
Japanese pornographic film actresses
Japanese female adult models
1991 births
Living people
Horikoshi High School alumni
People from Tokyo